The 1924–25 Yorkshire Cup was the seventeenth occasion on which the competition was held. This year's final was between two local rivals, Wakefield Trinity, who won the trophy by beating Batley by the score of 9-8. The match was played at Headingley, Leeds, now in West Yorkshire. The attendance was 25,546 and receipts were £1,912.

Background 

The Rugby Football League's Yorkshire Cup competition was a knock-out competition between (mainly professional) rugby league clubs from  the  county of Yorkshire. The actual area was at times increased to encompass other teams from  outside the  county such as Newcastle, Mansfield, Coventry, and even London (in the form of Acton & Willesden.

The Rugby League season always (until the onset of "Summer Rugby" in 1996) ran from around August-time through to around May-time and this competition always took place early in the season, in the Autumn, with the final taking place in (or just before) December (The only exception to this was when disruption of the fixture list was caused during, and immediately after, the two World Wars).

Competition and results  

This season there were again two junior/amateur clubs taking part, Wyke and Castleford. The  number of entries remained at last year's "full house" total of sixteen again obviating the necessity of having byes.

Round 1 
Involved  5 matches (with three byes) and 13 clubs

Round 1 - replays  
Involved  1 match and 2 clubs

Round 2 – quarterfinals 
Involved 4 matches and 8 clubs

Round 3 – semifinals  
Involved 2 matches and 4 clubs

Final

Teams and scorers 

Scoring - Try = three (3) points - Goal = two (2) points - Drop goal = two (2) points

The road to success

Notes 
1 * Castleford were at that time a junior club. They joined the league for season 1926–27

2 * Wyke are a junior/amateur club from Wyke, near Bradford            http://www.pitchero.com/clubs/wykearlfc/a/history-7698.html

3 * Headingley, Leeds, is the home ground of Leeds RLFC with a capacity of 21,000. The record attendance was  40,175 for a league match between Leeds and Bradford Northern on 21 May 1947.

4 * The  initial is given as "A Davidge" in the book "100 Years of Rugby. The History of Wakefield Trinity 1873–1973"

See also 
1924–25 Northern Rugby Football League season
Rugby league county cups

References

External links
Saints Heritage Society
1896–97 Northern Rugby Football Union season at wigan.rlfans.com
Hull&Proud Fixtures & Results 1896/1897
Widnes Vikings - One team, one passion Season In Review - 1896-97
The Northern Union at warringtonwolves.org

RFL Yorkshire Cup
Yorkshire Cup